Samuel Gordon (10 September 1871 – 10 January 1927) was an English novelist, short story writer, and playwright. His fiction largely focused on the lives of contemporary English and Russian Jews.

Biography
Samuel Gordon was born in Buk, Province of Posen, to Jewish parents Bertha and Rev. Abraham Elias Gordon. He went to England with his parents in 1883, where his father became cantor of the Great Synagogue of London. Gordon was educated at the City of London School, and read Classics at Queens' College, Cambridge, obtaining a Bachelor of Arts degree in 1893. He was appointed secretary of the Great Synagogue the following year.

Gordon published several novels and volumes of short stories, mainly dealing with Jewish life and character, among them A Handful of Exotics (1897), Daughters of Shem (1898), Lesser Destinies (1899), Strangers at the Gate (1902), God's Remnants (1916), and the historical romance The Lost Kingdom; or, the Passing of the Khazars (1926). In Years of Tradition (1897) and The New Galatea (1901) were his chief works outside Jewish lines. Gordon's most accomplished work was Sons of the Covenant: A Tale of London Jewry (1900), which portrays the lives of two newly-arrived Jewish immigrants to London's East End.

He travelled widely in Europe and lived briefly in the United States. As a journalist, Gordon covered the Fourth Zionist Congress in London for The Manchester Guardian in 1900. He later worked in the Censor's Office during the World War I.

Gordon died on 10 January 1927 at the age of 55. A theatrical adaptation of Daughters of Shem was performed at the New Scala shortly after his death.

Bibliography

References
 

1871 births
1927 deaths
19th-century British Jews
20th-century British Jews
19th-century British short story writers
20th-century British short story writers
20th-century English dramatists and playwrights
19th-century English novelists
20th-century English novelists
19th-century Prussian people
Alumni of Queens' College, Cambridge
English Jewish writers
English male dramatists and playwrights
English male novelists
English male short story writers
German emigrants to England
Jewish dramatists and playwrights
Jewish novelists
People from the Province of Posen
Writers from London